Miel Pijs (born 22 August 1941) is a Dutch former footballer, who played at both professional and international levels as a defender.

Club career
Born in Valkenswaard, Pijs began playing amateur football with his hometown club VV De Valk. In 1961, he turned professional by signing with PSV Eindhoven. Pijs played for PSV in the Eredivisie for six seasons before finishing his career with spells at Sparta Rotterdam, N.E.C., FC Den Bosch and EVV Eindhoven. He was a member of PSV's 1962–63 Eredivisie winning side.

International career
Pijs made his debut for the Netherlands in a November 1965 FIFA World Cup qualification match against Switzerland. He would make a total of eight international appearances, scoring one goal against Hungary.

References

1941 births
Living people
Association football forwards
Dutch footballers
Netherlands international footballers
PSV Eindhoven players
Sparta Rotterdam players
NEC Nijmegen players
FC Den Bosch players
FC Eindhoven players
Eredivisie players
People from Valkenswaard
VV De Valk players
Footballers from North Brabant